Longitarsus aubozaorum is a species of beetle in the subfamily Galerucinae that is endemic to Turkey.

References

A
Beetles described in 1997
Endemic fauna of Turkey
Beetles of Asia